Itziar Aretxaga Méndez (born 1965) is a Spanish and Mexican astrophysicist who works in Mexico as a researcher at the National Institute of Astrophysics, Optics and Electronics (INAOE). Her research interests include galaxy formation and evolution, active galactic nuclei, starbursts, and supernovae.

Education and career
Born in Bilbao, Spain on 20 November 1965, Aretxaga has dual Spanish and Mexican citizenship; her first name and paternal surname are Basque. Her mother was a dressmaker and her father taught in an occupational school; she was part of the first generation of her family with a university education.

She was an undergraduate at the Complutense University of Madrid, graduating with a bachelor's degree in physics in 1988. She moved to the Autonomous University of Madrid for graduate study in physics, earning a master's degree in 1990 and completing her PhD in 1993.

Next she became a postdoctoral researcher at the Royal Greenwich Observatory in England from 1993 to 1996 and at the Max Planck Institute for Astrophysics in Germany from 1996 to 1998, supported by the Basque Government and by a Marie Curie Fellowship. She came to INAOE as a researcher in 1998 and earned tenure there in 2004.

She has been the director of the International School for Young Astronomers program of the International Astronomical Union since 2018.

Recognition
Aretxaga is a member of the Mexican Academy of Sciences, elected in 2003.

References

External links
Home page

1965 births
Living people
Basque academics
Basque women
Mexican astrophysicists
Spanish astrophysicists
Women astrophysicists
Complutense University of Madrid alumni
Members of the Mexican Academy of Sciences